Discotectonica is a genus of sea snails, marine gastropod mollusks in the family Architectonicidae, the staircase shells or sundials.

Distribution
This genus occurs in the Atlantic Ocean off the Canaries and West African, in European waters (the Bay of Biscay) and the Mediterranean Sea.

Species
Species within the genus Discotectonica include:
 Discotectonica acutissima (Sowerby, 1914)
 Discotectonica alfi Thach, 2017
 Discotectonica discus (Philippi, 1844)
 Discotectonica nipponica (Kuroda & Habe in Kuroda, Habe & Oyama, 1971)
 Discotectonica petasus (Tomlin, 1928)
 Discotectonica placentalis (Hinds, 1844)
 Discotectonica pseudoperspective (Brocchi, 1814)

References

 Bieler R. (1993). Architectonicidae of the Indo-Pacific (Mollusca, Gastropoda). Abhandlungen des Naturwissenschaftlichen Vereins in Hamburg (NF) 30: 1-376 [15 December]. page(s): 116
 Gofas, S.; Le Renard, J.; Bouchet, P. (2001). Mollusca, in: Costello, M.J. et al. (Ed.) (2001). European register of marine species: a check-list of the marine species in Europe and a bibliography of guides to their identification. Collection Patrimoines Naturels, 50: pp. 180–213
 Rolán E., 2005. Malacological Fauna From The Cape Verde Archipelago. Part 1, Polyplacophora and Gastropoda.

Architectonicidae